Atatürk Forest is a planted forest named after Mustafa Kemal Atatürk, founder of the Turkish Republic, located in the southern area of Mount Carmel in Israel. The forest was planted on barren land by immigrants from Turkey in 1953.

History
The forest was established in 1953 by Turkish Jews who had immigrated to Israel. Trees were planted on what was a barren mountain. An opening ceremony was held attended by Israeli president Yitzhak Ben-Zvi and Turkish Ambassador Şefket İstinyeli who both also planted a tree in the forest that day. A sign reads:  In documented photos, Turkish women are seen taking a moment of respect in front of a plaque with that quote on it. At least as of 1972, Turks who visited the forest and planted a tree would receive a diploma.

There was a large fire on Mount Carmel in 2010. Atatürk Forest, being on the south side of the summit of the mountain, which is not the side that the fire was on, was unharmed by the fire.

Other
(Turkish:Atatürk Ormanı), (Hebrew:יער אתאטורק)

There is also an Atatürk Forest Recreation Area.

The forest also contains memorials to the martyred.

References

Geography of Haifa
Forests of Israel
Forest